Stephen Edgar (born 1 February 1967) is a former Australian rules footballer who played with Carlton in the Australian Football League (AFL). Drafted from West Australian Football League (WAFL) team East Fremantle in 1989, Edgar played 14 games for Carlton in the two years he was at the club. After being delisted, Edgar moved back to his former team, East Fremantle, and won a WAFL premiership with the side in 1994, after replacing Jason Sherriff in the team after breaking his thumb and missing the Preliminary Final.

Notes

External links

Stephen Edgar's profile at Blueseum

1967 births
Carlton Football Club players
East Fremantle Football Club players
Australian rules footballers from Western Australia
Living people